Vyazma is a town and the administrative center of Vyazemsky District in Smolensk Oblast, Russia, located on the Vyazma River, about halfway between Smolensk, the administrative center of the oblast, and Mozhaysk. Throughout its turbulent history, it defended western approaches to Moscow. Population:    44,000 (1970).

Medieval history and monuments
Vyazma was first mentioned in a chronicle under the year of 1230, although it is believed to be much older than that. The town was named after the river, whose name was from Russian word "" (vyaz), meaning "bog" or "swamp". At the time, the town belonged to a lateral branch of the Rurikid House of Smolensk, and carried on a lively trade with Narva on the Gulf of Finland. In 1403, the local princes were expelled by Lithuanians to Moscow, where they took the name of Princes Vyazemsky. The most notable among them were Pyotr Vyazemsky, an intimate friend of the poet Alexander Pushkin and a poet himself, and Sophie Viazemski, a French writer, for a time married to Jean-Luc Godard.

In 1494, Vyazma was captured by the Grand Duchy of Moscow and turned into a fortress, of which but a single tower remains. Two important abbeys were embellished with stone churches, including a rare three-tented church dedicated to Our Lady of Smolensk (Hodegetria) and consecrated in 1638 after Polish occupation between 1611 and 1634. A barbican church of the same abbey dates back to 1656, and the town's cathedral was completed by 1676. Other churches are designed mostly in baroque style.

Battles of Vyazma

Napoleonic wars

During the French invasion of Russia in 1812, there was a battle between the retreating French army (up to 37,000 troops) and the Russian army (25,000 men) near Vyazma on October 22, 1812. The vanguard of the Russian army under the command of Lieutenant General Mikhail Miloradovich and a Cossack unit of General Matvey Platov attacked the rearguard corps of Marshal Louis-Nicolas Davout east of Vyazma and cut off his retreat. Owing to the intervention of Eugène de Beauharnais and Józef Poniatowski, Davout managed to break through the Russian army's encirclement.

However, the French army's attempts to hold the heights near Vyazma and the town itself were unsuccessful. By the evening of October 22, Russians seized Vyazma, which had been set on fire by the French. The French lost 6,000 men during the battle; 2,500 soldiers were taken prisoners. The Russians lost around 2,000 men.

World War II
In 1941, during World War II, Vyazma was the scene of a battle of encirclement. The Soviet 16th, 19th, 20th and 24th armies were surrounded West of the town by the Third and Fourth Panzer Armies.

Vyazma was occupied by German forces between 7 October 1941 and 12 March 1943. In October 1941, 11 Jews were shot in the town and two were hanged. In December 1941, 117 Jews were killed in a mass execution perpetrated by the Einsatzgruppe B.

The town was heavily damaged in the fighting, then rebuilt after the war.  U.S. journalist Quentin Reynolds, of Collier's Weekly, visited Vyazma shortly after the German withdrawal in 1943 and gave an account of the destruction in his book The Curtain Rises (1944), in which he stated that the town's population was reduced from 60,000 to 716, with only three buildings remaining. The Nazis also established two concentration camps in the town, Dulag 184 and Dulag 230. About 80,000 people died there and were buried in mass graves. The victims included Jews, political officers, and POWs.

The transfer camp (Dulag No. 184) was established in October 1941 and lasted until March 1943, when the city was liberated by Soviet troops. The camp housed prisoners who had been captured by German soldiers, in particular, conscripted from Zubtsovsky, Rzhevsky, Nelidovsky and other districts of the Tver region, natives of the Smolensk and Arkhangelsk regions, who were reported missing, as well as volunteer militias from Moscow. Prisoners were often not fed or given water. In the winter of 1941–1942, the death rate in the camp was up to 300 people per day. According to SMERSH, there are 5,500 people on the list of dead from wounds in the camp. There are 40 (according to other data, 45) ditches measuring 4×100 meters, in an area equal to about four football fields, where, according to various data, 70 to 80,000 people are buried. As of 2009, the graves house gardens, garages of local residents, a machine-building plant and the Vyazemsky meat-processing plant, in the building of which the camp was housed.

In another transit prison in Vyazma (Dulag No. 230) in October 1941, during an inspection conducted by an officer, Abver found 200 Jews and 50 to 60 politruks, a few days later another 40 Jews and 6–8 politruks were found there. They were all shot. In December, 117 Jews were identified and executed at a POW camp in Vyazma.

According to the memoirs of the future Soviet historian, Mikhail Markovich Sheinman, who was in German captivity at the time:

In honor of the defenders of the Fatherland, a memorial complex has been erected on the Moscow–Minsk highway outside the city. In 2009, in the vicinity of Vyazma, where the battles took place in 1941, a memorial named "The Virgin Field" was opened. The burial ground, where tens of thousands of people died in the death camp, is buried in the territory of the existing meat-processing plant, now marked chapel in memory of the dead prisoners of war.

Administrative and municipal status
Within the framework of administrative divisions, Vyazma serves as the administrative center of Vyazemsky District. As an administrative division, it is incorporated within Vyazemsky District as Vyazemskoye Urban Settlement'. As a municipal division, this administrative unit also has urban settlement status and is a part of Vyazemsky Municipal District.

Economy

The town's main industries in the present day are engineering, leather working, graphite products, and flax textiles.

Historically the town was known for its pryaniki, which are even mentioned in classical works of Russian literature. The original recipe, as well as the technology and knowledge, were lost during the revolutionary period. Attempts to resurrect the pryanik industry during the Soviet period were unsuccessful, but in post-Soviet times the local Вяземский хлебокомбинат (Vyazma [industrial] bakery) started once again to produce hand-made pryaniki, some of which were awarded prizes in national competitions.

Transportation

Vyazma is a major railway junction for both freight and passenger transport, with connecting trains from Moscow, St. Petersburg, Kaluga, and Bryansk. The long-distance (lastochka) train from Moscow to Smolensk stops at Vyazma, with travel time to and from the capital being between 2 and 2:30 hours. Short distance trains also go to and from Mozhaysk and Borodino, linking Vyazma to the Moscow suburban railway network.

Vyazma is also located near the main M1 Highway between Moscow and Minsk.

The nearby Vyazma Airport serves military and recreational purposes, but there are no commercial flights to or from the city.

Education
The only university in the city is the Smolensk Cossack Institute of Industrial Technologies and Business, a regional branch of the Kirill Razumovsky Moscow State University of Technology and Management (First Cossack University).

Vyzma also hosts several institutions of tertiary and further education:
Vyazma Polytechnic College
Vyazma Railway College
Efrem Mukhin Vyazma Medical College

Sports
The town association football club, FK Vyazma, plays in the Amateur football league.

The town is known for the aviation-squadron Vyazma Russ which flies in Aero L-39 Albatros jet aircraft.

Climate

Notable people
Boris Almazov (1827–1876), poet, translator and literary critic
Leonid Teliga (1917-1970), Polish sailor
Sergei Davydov (born 1979), football player
Igor Korobov (1956–2018), chief of GRU
Anatoli Papanov (1922–1987), film and theater actor and director
Nikolai Plotnikov (1897–1979), film and theater actor
Vasily Stroganov (1858–1938), physician and scientist
Klaudia Sergejewna Kildisheva (1917 - 1994), aviation engineer and Hero of Socialist Labor
Pavel Yushkov (born 1979), former Russian professional footballer

References

Notes

Sources

Further reading
 Vinogradov, Ivan Pavlovich. (1890) Historical Sketch of Vyazma from ancient times until the 17th century. (Inclusive) (Исторический очерк города Вязьмы с древнейших времен до XVII в. (включительно)) at Runivers.ru in DjVu and PDF formats

External links
Official website of Vyazma 
Pictures of Vyazma 

Cities and towns in Smolensk Oblast
Vyazemsky Uyezd